Kershawl J. Sykes-Martin (born 26 April 1999) is a New Zealand rugby union player who plays for  in the Bunnings NPC and the  in Super Rugby. His position is prop.

Career
He played another 2 matches for the side in 2020 as they went on to win their second premiership title in a row. Sykes-Martin was ruled out of the 2021 Bunnings NPC with injury.

Reference list

External links
itsrugby.co.uk profile

1999 births
Living people
New Zealand rugby union players
People educated at Saint Kentigern College
Rugby union players from Ruatoria
Rugby union props
Tasman rugby union players
Crusaders (rugby union) players